Trevor Ruffin (born September 26, 1970) is an American former professional basketball player who played briefly in the National Basketball Association (NBA).

The 6'1" point guard played at the University of Hawaii from 1992 to 1994. While leading the Rainbow Warriors to a 1994 NCAA tournament appearance, Trevor set the school's single game individual scoring record with 42 points vs. the University of Louisville.  He entered the NBA undrafted in 1994, where he played with the Phoenix Suns and the Philadelphia 76ers from 1994–1996. He played with the PAOK from Thessaloniki Greece in 1995. He was waived by the ABA's Buffalo Rapids/Silverbacks during the 2005–2006 season due to injury but returned as interim head coach in November 2006 following the resignation of Richard Jacob. He has since been succeeded by Marc Fulcher.

Although he only started in 24 out of 110 career NBA games, Ruffin was known to provide instant point production when he entered the game as a substitute. Similar to another 6'1" former Phoenix Sun guard Eddie House, Ruffin provided "instant offense" when he came into the game off the bench. In fact, during his rookie season with Phoenix in 1994–95, he averaged 29.2 points per 40 minutes (nearly 5 points in 6.5 minutes per game) while playing as a 12th man behind Elliot Perry and Kevin Johnson.

External links
 NBA stats @ basketballreference.com
 College stats @ sportsstats.com

1970 births
Living people
African-American basketball players
American Basketball Association (2000–present) coaches
American men's basketball coaches
American men's basketball players
Arizona Western Matadors men's basketball players
Basketball players from Buffalo, New York
Basketball coaches from New York (state)
Florida Beachdogs players
Greek Basket League players
Hawaii Rainbow Warriors basketball players
P.A.O.K. BC players
Philadelphia 76ers players
Phoenix Suns players
Point guards
Sportspeople from Buffalo, New York
Undrafted National Basketball Association players
Vancouver Grizzlies expansion draft picks
21st-century African-American sportspeople
20th-century African-American sportspeople